Warrior Dog Foundation is a non-profit organization (EIN: 46-2092762) located in the Cooper, Texas, United States that provides care and comfort to dogs that have ended their service supporting American troops. Its main goal is to give the dogs a place to live out their golden years having fun on a ranch with dignity and respect.

Programs

The foundation helps to transition dogs from an operational environment into its state-of-the-art kennel facility. The foundation educates the public on the importance of K-9s in the combat environment, and showcases the level of sacrifice these dogs give in support of U.S. troops. The foundation cares for each individual SOF K-9 with dignity and grace, including both mental and physical rehabilitation for the rest of their lives.

Founding

Warrior Dog Foundation was founded by former Navy SEAL Mike Ritland.

History

It was started in 2013, its kennel is located Cooper, Texas.

See also

 Animals in War Memorial
 Dogs in warfare
 Dickin Medal
 Examples of dogs that gained notability in war
 1st Military Working Dog Regiment
 War Dog Memorial (Bristol Township, Pennsylvania)

References

External links
 Warrior Dog Foundation Official Website

Non-profit organizations based in Texas